Cotton Gin Port is a ghost town in Monroe County, Mississippi, United States.

Geography

History
Cotton Gin Port was the first town settled by Europeans in what became north Mississippi. It was developed on the east bank of the Tombigbee River, at a crossing of vital Indian trails. This had been a base of expeditions of French explorers Jean-Baptiste Le Moyne de Bienville in 1736 and Vaudreuil in 1752. 

After the United States acquired the territory, it was first considered part of Marion County in the Alabama Territory. 

The new demarcation lines of 1820-21 established a state boundary that allocated the town and related area to Mississippi. 

The early U.S. government built a cotton gin in 1801 at Cotton Gin Port as part of a "plan of civilization" for the local Chickasaw, whom it wanted to have adopt European-American customs. The settlement soon became recognized as a trading post for business with the Chickasaw. A road, Gaines Trace, was built to the town in 1811 and 1812. This road ran from close to present-day Muscle Shoals on the Tennessee River to Cotton Gin Port, where it crossed the Tombigbee. From there it continued south to Fort Stoddert, Alabama.

As railroads were constructed in the region, the Kansas City, Memphis & Birmingham Railroad bypassed Cotton Gin Port, and established a new railroad town at Amory, Mississippi. In a pattern repeated in numerous other places, this bypass resulted in the older town being abandoned, as businesses and residents moved to have access to the railroad at Amory.

The ruins of the old town can still be found between the Tenn-Tom Waterway and the Tombigbee River. Relics from the former settlement can be seen at the Amory Municipal Museum. Levi Colbert, a chief of the Chickasaw, is said to have lived on the bluff west of Cotton Gin Port, near a large spreading oak known as the council tree, a meeting place for tribal elders. The former cotton gin was built near here.

References

 Elliott, Jack D. and Wells, Mary Ann. (2003). Cotton Gin Port : a frontier settlement on the Upper Tombigbee. Jackson, Mississippi: Quail Ridge Press for the Mississippi Historical Society.

External links
http://homepages.rootsweb.com/~cmamcrk4/pkt14.html
https://web.archive.org/web/20120219002136/http://files.usgwarchives.org/ms/monroe/history/cottongp.txt

Former populated places in Monroe County, Mississippi
Ghost towns in Mississippi
National Register of Historic Places in Monroe County, Mississippi
Populated places on the National Register of Historic Places in Mississippi
Chickasaw
Louisiana (New France)
Pre-statehood history of Mississippi
Native American history of Mississippi